Conny Andersson may refer to:

 Conny Andersson (racing driver) (born 1939), Swedish former racing driver
 Conny Andersson (footballer) (born 1945), Swedish former footballer